The 2016 Federation Cup also known as Walton Federation Cup 2016 due to the sponsorship from Walton was the 28th edition of the tournament. A total of 12 teams competed in this tournament. Sheikh Jamal Dhanmondi Club was the winner of previous edition of the tournament.

The tournament kicked off on 10 June 2016 with the match between Mohammedan Sporting Club Limited and Rahmatganj Muslim Friends Society at the Bangabandhu National Stadium.

Dhaka Abahani lifted the title of Federation Cup with a 1–0 victory over Sheikh Moni Arambagh KS at the Bangabandhu National Stadium on 26 June 2016.

Venues

Group stage
The twelve participants were divided into four groups. The top two teams for each group qualified for the quarter finals.

Group A

Group B

Group C

Group D

Bracket

Quarter final

Quarter final 1

Quarter final 2

Quarter final 3

Quarter final 4

Semi-final

Semi-final 1

Semi-final 2

Final

Goal scorers
Top 5

References

External links
 bff.com.bd 

2016
2016 in Bangladeshi football
Bangladesh